WBT (1110 kHz) is a commercial AM radio station serving the Charlotte metropolitan area, including parts of North Carolina and South Carolina. First licensed on March 18, 1922, it is one of America's first radio stations.

The station airs a news/talk radio format simulcast on WBT-FM (99.3) and the HD2 digital subchannel of co-owned WLNK. WBT is owned by Urban One. Studios and offices are located off West Morehead Street, just west of Uptown Charlotte, co-located with the city's CBS television affiliate, WBTV, currently owned by Gray Television but at one time co-owned with WBT Radio.

WBT broadcasts 50,000 watts around the clock as the only Class A clear-channel station in the Carolinas. Its transmitter is in the southern part of the city off Nations Ford Road. During daylight hours it uses a single non-directional antenna and is audible in much of the central Carolinas. At night it uses a directional antenna that limits its signal toward the west, in order to avoid interfering with KFAB in Omaha, Nebraska, the other Class A station on the frequency. Even with this restriction, it can be heard across much of the eastern half of North America with a good radio. For many years, WBT boasted that it could be heard "from Maine to Miami" at night.

Programming
On weekdays, WBT airs mostly locally produced talk shows and offer podcasts of these shows on its website. News, weather, and traffic reports are heard each half-hour.

WBT begins each weekday with "The Bo Thompson Morning Show," a five-hour drive time news and talk program.  Vince Coakley, former WSOC-TV news anchor and North Carolina Congressional candidate, hosts late mornings. Brett Winterble is heard in the late afternoon and a one-hour newsmagazine called "Charlotte at Six" is anchored by Mark Garrison.  Brett Jensen serves as the senior news reporter, who also covers the NFL's Carolina Panthers.  The rest of the weekday schedule is made up of nationally syndicated conservative talk hosts including Mark Levin, Ben Shapiro, Michael Knowles and Coast to Coast AM with George Noory.

Weekends feature shows on money, health, real estate, technology, the outdoors, cars and home repair, some of which are paid brokered programming.  Syndicated shows include Glenn Beck, Bill Cunningham, Ric Edelman, "Our American Stories with Lee Habeeb" and "The Tech Guy with Leo Laporte."  Some hours begin with ABC Radio News.

Sports
WBT was the flagship station of the Carolina Panthers from the team's 1995 inception until 1999, when WRFX became the flagship. WBT regained the rights to air Panthers games starting with the 2005 season until the agreement ended in 2021, when WRFX once again became the flagship of the Carolina Panthers radio network.

WBT was the flagship of the Charlotte Hornets from the team's debut in 1988 until the team moved to New Orleans in 2002. From 1991 to 1995, WBT was the Charlotte-area home of the Duke Blue Devils. It was also the Charlotte home of the University of North Carolina Tar Heels from 1977 to 1991 and again from 1995 to 2006. The Tar Heels returned to WBT in 2012.

History

Formation
As with many early radio stations, there is a limited amount of information about WBT's origins. Wesley Wallace's 1962 review of the history of North Carolina radio reported being frustrated "by the absence or inaccessibility" of information, noting that "Broadcasters have been too busy acting in the present tense to take much thought of the past; hence they have discarded much of the memorabilia of broadcasting's earlier days."

WBT was first licensed as a broadcasting station on March 18, 1922. However, the station traces its history to earlier broadcasts made in a joint effort by Fred Laxton, associated with General Electric, Earle J. Gluck, a Westinghouse Electric and Manufacturing Company engineer and Frank Bunker, a Southern Bell Telephone Company employee. During World War I a ban was in place that suspended amateur radio transmissions. In late 1919 the ban was lifted, and all three became licensed radio amateurs. Most amateurs at this time used spark transmitters that could only transmit the dots-and-dashes of Morse code, however, Laxton managed to acquire a scarce vacuum tube from General Electric, which made audio transmissions possible.

The three decided to set up a transmitter in an abandoned chicken coop located behind Laxton's home at 2462 Mecklenburg Avenue, with a microphone line running to the home's living room. Laxton's daughter later remembered being drafted as a child to repeatedly count into the microphone for the early test transmissions. These initial transmissions eventually were expanded into the playing of phonograph records, which resulted in enough interest from local amateurs, as well as technically advanced members of the general public, that a regular schedule of broadcasts was established. In late 1920 the station was issued an Experimental radio station license to Fred Laxton, located at his home address, with the call sign 4XD.

The growing interest in radio led to the December 1921 founding of the Southern Radio Corporation, located in the Realty Building, in order to sell radio parts and equipment. The initial officers were Fred Laxton, president, J. B. Marshall, vice president, and Frank Bunker, commercial engineer in charge. It was also announced at this time that the company planned to installed a transmitter and rooftop antenna at the Realty building, to be used for "sending out concerts, big speeches and other entertainment to those who own home outfits within a radius of 200 miles from Charlotte".

Early years

Initially there were no specific standards in the United States for radio stations making transmissions intended for the general public, and numerous stations under various classifications made entertainment broadcasts. However, effective December 1, 1921, the Department of Commerce, the regulators of radio at this time, adopted a regulation that formally created a broadcasting station category, and stations were now required to hold a Limited Commercial license authorizing operation on wavelengths of 360 meters for "entertainment" broadcasts or 485 meters for "market and weather reports" (833 and 619 kHz).

The Southern Radio Corporation was issued a "provisional" broadcasting station license, with the randomly assigned call letters WBT, on March 18, 1922, which authorized broadcasts on the 360 meter entertainment wavelength. WBT made its first broadcast four days later on March 22. The next day's Charlotte Observer reported that: "Erected by the Southern Radio corporation of this city and attached to the Realty building, this station, officially designated as WBT, operating on a 360 meter wavelength, this station will arrange musical concerts, addresses on various subjects and will give nightly programs for the benefit of approximately 20,000 receiving stations within a hearing radius. The first program was given last night and several stations in this section are known to have picked up the Victrola music broadcasted." This article further described the "wireless telephone broadcasting station" as "the first station that has been erected and put in active operating condition in the Carolinas. A station has been erected at State college in West Raleigh, but it did not work properly and it will probably be a few weeks before it will be in a position to do any broadcasting." On April 11, following a successful inspection by the Fourth Radio District inspector, Walter Van Nostrand Jr on April 4, 1922, the license's "provisional" qualifier was removed.

In October 1925, Fred Laxton sold the Southern Radio Corporation to the Carolina States Electric Company for approximately $50,000, while retaining control of WBT. However, the next month the station was sold to Charlotte Buick automobile dealer C. C. Coddington, who would promote both the radio station and his auto dealership with the slogan "Watch Buicks Travel". The station was moved to the top of the Coddington building, although Coddington later moved the transmitter site to farm property he owned on Nations Ford Road in south Charlotte, where it remains today.

On November 11, 1928, under the provisions of the Federal Radio Commission's General Order 40, WBT was assigned to a "clear channel" frequency of 1080 kHz, which gave it exclusive national nighttime use of that frequency. In 1929 C.C. Coddington sold WBT to the two-year-old CBS Radio Network. In subsequent years a series of power increases raised the station's from 5,000 watts to the maximum permitted, 50,000 watts. The 50,000 watt transmitter was dedicated on August 12, 1932.

CBS Radio and Amos & Andy
In 1925, Freeman Gosden and Charlie Correll started a comedy show carried by WBT that was a forerunner to Amos and Andy. Russ Hodges, later famous as the radio voice of the New York/San Francisco Giants, was sports editor of WBT for a time in the late 1930s, leaving in 1941 for Washington, D.C.

During the Golden Age of Radio, WBT carried the CBS schedule of dramas, comedies, news, sports, soap operas, game shows and big band broadcasts to listeners in the Carolinas and at night, around the Southern United States. One musical program was "Arthur Smith and the Crackerjacks". Smith, best known for writing the song that became the Deliverance theme "Dueling Banjos", went to work at WBT at age 20 at the invitation of station manager Charles Crutchfield. He played guitar and fiddle for musical programs on WBT before getting his own show. Crutchfield believed that Charlotte, not Nashville, could have ended up being the country music capital because of the station's early "Briarhoppers" and "Carolina Hayride" shows, which may have inspired The Grand Ole Opry.

In March 1941, as part of the implementation of the North American Regional Broadcasting Agreement, WBT was shifted to 1110 kHz, where it has been ever since. During the previous November 11, 1928 frequency reassignments, two midwestern stations, WBBM in Chicago and KFAB in Omaha, Nebraska, had been placed on 780 kHz, which meant they had to synchronize their programming during nighttime hours. In order to eliminate this restriction, in 1944 a reassignment plan was announced that moved KFAB to 1110 kHz, which in turn required WBT to start operating with a directional antenna at night, to limit its signal toward KFAB. In order to mitigate the nighttime coverage loss, in July 1947 a 1,000-watt "booster" transmitter, located five miles northeast of Shelby, North Carolina, was authorized "for benefit of nighttime listeners west of Charlotte". (Use of the booster transmitter ended sometime in the early 1960s.)

New FCC regulations forced CBS to sell WBT when the network reached the maximum number of stations it could own. In 1945, it was acquired by the Jefferson Standard Life Insurance Company, forerunner of Jefferson-Pilot, and became its flagship station. After the sale, it remained a CBS affiliate. In 1947, an FM sister station at 99.9 MHz was put on the air. But that WBT-FM was discontinued in the mid-1950s and is not same as today's WBT-FM 99.3, which first went on the air in 1969 as WCMJ, owned by the York-Clover Broadcasting Company. In 1949, Jefferson Standard signed on Charlotte's first television station, WBTV. It has been with the CBS Television Network since its signon, mirroring its radio sister.

Early hosts
Grady Cole was WBT morning host for 32 years, replaced in 1961 by Ty Boyd, who hosted the morning show until 1973, playing such artists as Duke Ellington, Peggy Lee and Petula Clark. Then he moved to WBTV to host television shows. He returned to WBT in 2008 to co-host the morning show while its regular hosts took time off.

Changes in the 1970s
WBT was the number one station in Charlotte for many years. Among its employees were Charles Kuralt and Nelson Benton. But by 1970, WBT was down to number nine in the ratings, and national advertisers wanted ratings to improve. Jefferson Standard did not like the idea of change, but the company brought in researchers to show what programming Charlotte wanted.  WBT let go 28 staffers and spent $200,000 on changes that included new studios. It also canceled many programs that advertisers supported but which did not attract enough listeners.

On March 15, 1971, WBT switched to adult contemporary music during the day. Rob Hunter and H. A. Thompson were new DJs. Bob Lacey started at WBT in 1972 with a nighttime talk show "Lacey Listens". Two years later, WBT had reached number one again, reaching the highest Arbitron numbers on record to this day. Around the same time, the station dropped its longtime affiliation with the CBS Radio Network and joined ABC Radio. WBT won Billboard adult contemporary station of the year in 1976 and 1978.

In 1978, Marty Lambert became Jeff Pilot, the traffic reporter for WBT and WBCY. Lambert became assistant program director and music director in 1982.

Larry James left his midnight to 6 A.M. shift at WBT for WYDE in Birmingham, Alabama in November 1978 after winning the Country Music Association Disc Jockey of the Year for medium markets. Then he returned to WBT for the same shift in January 1979.

Talk shows at night
In September 1979, Henry Boggan, who had been a midday host and program director at WBIG in Greensboro, North Carolina, began hosting a talk show. it was similar to "Lacey Listens", with "nice-guy" talk, not controversial issues. Like Lacey's, which received calls from far away, his show would reach a large number of listeners. The show ran from 9 P.M. to 1 A.M., meaning Don Russell's show would start two hours earlier at 5 and run for four hours instead of five, and James' overnight show would start an hour later.

WBT dropped its ABC affiliation in favor of NBC Radio in 1987. Talk programming continued to increase on WBT through the 1980s, mostly at night. Larry King, on the Mutual Broadcasting System, moved from WSOC and stayed on WBT until 1987, when WBT decided its new NBC affiliation needed to take priority over other networks. Bruce Williams' syndicated financial advice show, part of the NBC Talknet block, replaced King. WBT expanded "Hello Henry" and its "Sports Huddle" program.

For their entire 14 years in Charlotte, starting with the inaugural 1988–89 season, WBT aired the games of the original NBA Hornets franchise.

Seeking more women listeners
WBT made changes to its format on December 10, 1990, hoping to attract more women. The station dropped James K. Flynn, Thompson and Tom Desio, generating numerous protests. Don Russell had hosted "Russell & Flynn" in the morning; the show was renamed "Russell & Friends". John Hancock became midday host, and WBTV personalities Mike and Barbara McKay began an afternoon program. Boggan, whose show had run in the afternoon, returned to his evening slot, replacing Desio, but was sometimes pre-empted by sports programs. WBT also switched its network affiliation from NBC back to CBS on December 21

Adding Rush Limbaugh
On September 3, 1991, WBT dropped the McKays and became the 400th station to air The Rush Limbaugh Show, which had already been heard in the Charlotte area on WADA in Shelby, WSIC in Statesville and WHKY in Hickory.

In 1995, Jefferson-Pilot bought WBZK-FM 99.3 in Chester, South Carolina to provide a simulcast signal that better served the western part of the market at night. At this time the FM station's call letters were changed to WBT-FM. That same year the station began airing games of the NFL Carolina Panthers inaugural season until 1999, returning as the team's flagship station in 2005.

Lincoln Financial Group bought Jefferson-Pilot in 2006. The merged company retained Jefferson-Pilot's broadcasting division, renaming it Lincoln Financial Media. In January 2008, Lincoln Financial sold WBT-AM-FM and WLNK to Greater Media of Braintree, Massachusetts. Lincoln-Financial then sold its three television stations, including WBTV, to Raycom Media—thus breaking up Charlotte's last heritage radio/television cluster. Greater Media had long wanted to expand into the fast-growing Charlotte market; its owner had wanted to buy WBT after hearing its signal at night on Cape Cod.

North Carolina Tar Heels
Also in 2006, WBT lost the North Carolina Tar Heels to all sports WFNZ. Sales director Steve Sklenar said the games pre-empted John Hancock's show and, during the ACC Tournament, Rush Limbaugh. WBT wanted the games, Sklenar said, but the pre-emptions cost the station advertising revenue. The Tar Heels had aired on WBT from 1977 to 1991, and returned to the station in 1995. According to Cullie Tarleton, who ran the station at that time, putting the Tar Heels on WBT was largely the idea of longtime coach Dean Smith, who wanted to tell recruits from the New York City area that their parents would be able to listen to the games.

On May 5, 2012, WBT signed back on with the Tar Heel Sports Network to be Charlotte's main carrier of the Tar Heels. After WRFX carried night basketball games for several years, WNOW-FM took over up until this year. With this switch back, games can now be heard all up and down the Eastern Seaboard at night, as WBT's clear channel signal can be heard from "Maine to Miami".

Programming changes
On June 8, 2012, WBT announced that The Brad and Britt Show, hosted by Brad Krantz and Britt Whitmire of WPTK in Raleigh, would be taking over the afternoon slot from Vince Coakley effective July 2. Krantz and libertarian Richard Spires had a show on WBT prior to 2003.  In June 2013, the show moved to 6pm-9pm; Hancock would take over the 3pm-6pm afternoon drive slot, where he remained until semi-retiring in October 2019, after nearly 30 years at WBT.

On November 15, 2013, both WBT and WBTV were dedicated with a North Carolina historic marker at the corner of Tryon Street and Third Street.  The Wilder Building, which was demolished in 1983, hosted the WBT's studios from 1924–1955. The sign reads "WBT/WBTV – Oldest broadcast stations in North Carolina established 1922. WBT radio long hosted live country music. WBTV sign-on, July 15, 1949. Studios here until 1955."

On March 3, 2014, WBT again dropped CBS News and returned to ABC News. In making the move, the station cited the stronger resources ABC's reporters provides to WBT's local programming compared to CBS and Fox News Radio.

Sale to Entercom
On July 19, 2016, Greater Media announced that it would merge with Beasley Media Group. Because Beasley already had the maximum number of stations in the Charlotte market with 5 FMs and 2 AMs, WBT-AM-FM and WLNK were spun off to a divestiture trust, eventually going to a permanent buyer. On October 18, 2016, Entercom announced that it would purchase WBT-AM-FM and WLNK, plus WFNZ. Upon the completion of the Greater/Beasley merger on November 1, Entercom began operating the stations via a time brokerage agreement, which lasted until the sale was consummated on January 6, 2017.

Sale to Urban One
On November 5, 2020, Urban One agreed to a station swap with Entercom in which they would swap ownership of four stations in Philadelphia, St. Louis and Washington, D.C. to Entercom in exchange for their cluster of Charlotte stations, including WBT and WBT-FM. As part of the terms of the deal, Urban One took over operations via a local marketing agreement on November 23. The swap was consummated on April 20, 2021.

Broadcasting facilities
WBT's diamond-shaped antennas account for three of only eight operational Blaw-Knox towers in the United States. In the morning hours of September 22, 1989, the high winds from Hurricane Hugo severely damaged two of WBT's towers and nearly killed then-Chief Engineer, Bob White. The FCC approved WBT to operate at 25,000 watts with a non-directional pattern for the next year while the two damaged towers were rebuilt.

A single tower radiates the transmitter's full power during the day. At night, power is fed to all three towers in a directional pattern to protect KFAB in Omaha, Nebraska, which also operates on 1110 AM and employs a similar directional pattern that protects WBT to the east.

Despite its clear-channel status, WBT was long plagued by marginal nighttime coverage in some parts of the Charlotte area, especially the western portion, due to the need to adjust its signal at sundown to protect KFAB. To solve this problem, WBT operated a synchronous booster signal in Shelby from 1947 to the early 1960s. In 1995, then-owner Jefferson-Pilot bought WBZK in Chester, South Carolina, located 40 miles southwest of Charlotte, to provide a better signal to the western part of the market at night. WBZK's calls became WBT-FM. In 2012, sister station WLNK added a simulcast of WBT on its HD2 digital subcarrier.

Past hosts
Past hosts include "Hello Henry" Boggan, Ty Boyd, Grady Cole, John Hancock,  Mike Collins, "Rockin'" Ray Gooding, Bob Lacey, Jason Lewis and H.A. Thompson.

Don Russell is the station's longest-tenured personality, having worked at the station on six separate occasions since the 1970s.

From 2009 until March 31, 2011, Pete Kaliner hosted a local program in the 9-midnight slot, but was fired in a cost-cutting move by Greater Media.  Neal Boortz's syndicated show was heard on tape delay from 9pm-1am; however, this was a temporary move as nationally syndicated host and former WBT personality Jason Lewis began to be heard on the station from 9-midnight (on a three-hour delay from his live broadcast) beginning in May 2011.

Nearly two months after Kaliner's departure, Tara Servatius' contract was not renewed; Doug Kellett and Wayne Powers filled the 3-6pm slot on an interim basis while the station searched for a replacement. On June 22, 2011, former WSOC-TV lead anchor Vince Coakley, who had done fill-in work at WBT before, was named Servatius' replacement in the 3-6pm timeslot.  Coakley left after a little over a year and was replaced on July 2, 2012 by Brad Krantz (a former WBT host) and Britt Whitmire, formerly of WZTK. Krantz and Whitmire, in turn, were fired by the station on June 11, 2014, and were replaced by John Hancock, who moved up from evenings (6-9pm) and a 6pm local news hour hosted by Mark Garrison and a local show with former WFNZ host Brett Jensen from 7pm-10pm. Coakley, who became the Republican candidate for North Carolina's 12th District U.S. House seat in 2012, returned to the station in 2017.

In December 2012, morning co-host Stacey Simms left Charlotte's Morning News to spend more time with her family. On January 14, 2013, Charlotte native Doc Washburn, most recently a morning host at WFLF-FM in Panama City Beach, Florida, debuted in the 9pm-1am slot, bringing local talk to the timeslot for the first time in nearly two years, replacing Lewis and the retired Boortz. The show would be replaced by the nationally syndicated America Now with Andy Dean in May 2013; Washburn remained with the station as a fill-in host.

Following Entercom's takeover of WBT via LMA on October 31, 2016, Keith Larson, the station's longtime 9am-noon host, was fired. The station ran a rotation of fill-in hosts while searching for his replacement before hiring former WPTF Raleigh morning host Scott Fitzgerald for the slot. Scott was released in November 2017.

References

External links

FCC History Cards for WBT (covering 1927-1981)
 "BT Memories" by Reno Bailey  (btmemories.com)

BT
Urban One stations
News and talk radio stations in the United States
Radio stations established in 1922
Clear-channel radio stations
1922 establishments in North Carolina
Radio stations licensed before 1923 and still broadcasting